The Indian national cricket team toured England in the 1946 season and played 29 first-class fixtures with 11 wins, 4 defeats and 14 draws. The 1946 season marked a return to normal first-class cricket in England following the end of World War II. The Test series between England and India was the first to be played in England since the West Indies tour in 1939. England won the series 1–0 with two matches drawn, their success largely due to the impact of debutant Alec Bedser who took 22 wickets in his first two Tests.

Conditions in 1946
The Second World War in Europe having ended in May 1945, it was only possible to arrange eleven first-class matches in the 1945 English cricket season and so 1946, despite postwar recovery and continued rationing, was the first season in which a normal schedule of matches could be established in the County Championship and in Test cricket with the arrival of the Indian tourists.

In its review of the 1946 season, Wisden Cricketers' Almanack remarked that "the Indians were the first postwar touring side, and although they were outplayed in the Tests they raised the status and the dignity of their country's sport". Wisden also mentioned that "the weather in 1946 might have been dreadful, but it didn't stop the crowds flocking to games". The state of the weather was mentioned by John Arlott who wrote his first match report for The Guardian when the Indians played Worcestershire at New Road, Worcester on 4, 6 and 7 May. Arlott wrote that "New Road was bleak that Saturday morning... dark under the cloud, it was swept by a bitter gale howling across from Diglis". In his review of the tour, S. Canynge Caple wrote that the Indian tourists were very popular, their tour returning a sizeable profit, because large crowds turned out when the weather was fine in an otherwise "extremely dreary summer".

Derek Birley commented on the wider and political background to the tour. In January 1946, the Imperial Cricket Conference had drawn up a seven-year programme of Test series with India selected to make the first postwar tour of England. This, Birley remarked, despite the "mounting political crisis at home" and the grave shortage of equipment and clothing "in rationed and straitened Britain". It was the last Indian team before Partition and it presented a united front.

Indian squad
India used a 16-man squad captained by Iftikhar Ali Khan, the Nawab of Pataudi, who was one of the few players to represent two countries in Test cricket, having played for England during the 1930s.

Squad details below state the player's age at the beginning of the tour, his batting hand, his type of bowling, and his Ranji Trophy team at the time:

The team relied heavily on all-rounders and some of those listed above as batsmen or bowlers had all-round ability. All except Banerjee and Nimbalkar played in the Test series. The team was largely inexperienced at international level as only six players had made their Test debuts before the Second World War: Pataudi, Amarnath, Hindlekar, Merchant, Mushtaq Ali and Nayudu. In the first Test, which India lost heavily, the team had six debutants: Abdul Hafeez, Gul Mohammad, Hazare, Mankad, Modi and Shinde.

England selections
England staged two Test trials, the first in June a week before the First Test and the second in July a week before the Second Test. It was seven years since England had last played a Test match and there was a winter tour of Australia to come so the selectors wanted to look at a large number of players to try and quickly establish the best possible team. A total of 35 players were used in the two Test trials and, in the end, England used 19 players in the three Test matches, with as many as 10 making only a single appearance.

The details for each player below state his age at the beginning of the Indian tour, his batting hand, his type of bowling, and his County Championship club at the time:

Tour itinerary
The following is a list of the 33 matches played by the 1946 Indians. 29 including the three Test matches are recognised by ESPNcricinfo and CricketArchive as first-class fixtures: The four minor games are listed in italics.

Test series
England and India played three Tests between June and August.  England won the series 1–0 with two matches drawn:
 First Test at Lord's: England won by 10 wickets
 Second Test at Old Trafford: match drawn
 Third Test at The Oval: match drawn

First Test

Mainstays of the England team who each played in all three Tests were captain Wally Hammond, opening batsmen Len Hutton and Cyril Washbrook, middle order batsman Denis Compton and opening pace bowler Alec Bedser. For the first Test at Lord's, England had only three debutants compared with India's six. Bedser and batting all-rounder Jack Ikin were the only "new" players in that they had made two and five first-class appearances respectively before the war and each of them was now in his first full season. The third debutant was veteran seam bowler Frank Smailes who had been playing regularly for Yorkshire since 1932. England's other four players in this match were experienced pre-war players: batsman Joe Hardstaff junior, wicket-keeper Paul Gibb, leg spinner Doug Wright and pace bowler Bill Bowes.

India's six debutants were Gul Mohammad, Abdul Hafeez, Vijay Hazare, Vinoo Mankad, Rusi Modi and Sadu Shinde. The rest of the team were captain Pataudi, who was making his first appearance for India; Lala Amarnath, Dattaram Hindlekar, Vijay Merchant and C. S. Nayudu.

England won the first Test by a convincing ten wicket margin after Bedser took 11 wickets on debut and Hardstaff scored 205 not out. On each of the first two days the gates were closed about noon, when the crowds numbered nearly 30,000. Around 15,000 were present on the third day, on which the match finished at half past one. India won the toss and batted first but, with heavy rain having fallen, this proved anything but an advantage as the ground was wet throughout the first day to make run-scoring difficult. With the weather improving on the day prior to the start of the Test, the MCC predicted a start in accordance to the scheduled time of 11:30. Wisden says that Bedser maintained an admirable length at fast-medium pace, using swerve or spin to turn the ball appreciably from the sodden turf. Hardstaff's innings was one of great concentration and gave him his highest score in Test cricket after five and a quarter hours batting. He had great support from Gibb in a stand of 182 for the fifth wicket and some useful tailend contributions, especially by Smailes. India began the third day only 66 behind with six wickets in hand but Bedser and Wright caused a collapse which left England needing only 48 to win.

Second Test

England made team changes for the second Test in view of the need to try out several players ahead of the winter tour of Australia. Pace bowler Dick Pollard was introduced, making his Test debut in place of Smailes. Like Smailes, Pollard was an experienced player active since 1933. Veteran pace bowler Bill Voce was recalled in place of his former bodyline series colleague Bowes. India made three changes with Syed Mushtaq Ali, Chandra Sarwate and Ranga Sohoni coming in for Gul Mohammad, Shinde and Nayudu.

The second Test was drawn but it had a tense climax as India's last wicket pair Sohoni and Hindlekar held on for the final 13 minutes of play to secure the draw with England 125 runs ahead. Bedser again took 11 wickets and Pollard weighed in with 7. Compton, with two half centuries, was the top scorer.

The start of the match was delayed by rain and Pataudi was criticised by Wisden for asking England to bat on a "dead wicket" after he won the toss. England began with an opening stand of 81 between Hutton and Washbrook; they comfortably reached 236 for four at the close on Saturday evening. More rain fell and on Monday morning, India were able to take advantage of wet conditions, bowling England out for 294 with six wickets in an hour, England adding only another 58. India's batsmen were expected to struggle but Merchant and Mushtaq Ali began with a stand of 124, batting well into the afternoon, and then a collapse took place with Pollard enjoying a spell of five overs which realised four wickets for only seven runs and India after their bright start could only manage 160 for seven at the close. The weather relented on the final day and play began on time in bright sunshine, England soon disposing of the remaining Indian wickets. England hoped to score quickly to enable a declaration but Amarnath and Mankad bowled economically and kept the run rate down. Eventually, England declared and left needing India 278 in three hours, a target that "practically vanished" when Merchant was out second ball to Pollard. Bedser had a devastating spell after the tea break, reducing India to 138 for nine with only thirteen minutes left, but Sohoni and Hindlekar managed to hold on for the draw.

Third Test

England made six changes for the third Test, which was drawn after being ruined by rain. Batsmen Laurie Fishlock, Bill Edrich and James Langridge were recalled along with fast bowler Alf Gover. There were two debutants: wicket-keeper Godfrey Evans and Essex spinner Peter Smith who had been the subject of a hoax call-up in 1933. They replaced Ikin, Hardstaff, Gibb, Voce, Pollard and Wright. India made a single change, recalling Nayudu in place of Sarwate.

Play on the first day (a Saturday) could not begin until five o'clock and Wisden commented that it would not have been attempted then "but for the crowds of people who waited around the walls from early in the morning". About 10,000 people watched the evening session in which Merchant and Mushtaq Ali opened for India and scored 79 without loss. The partnership ended with a run out on Monday morning at 94 and India then lost three more wickets to reach 122 for four at lunch. Merchant was unluckily run out having scored a "masterful" 128. Edrich, who bowled straight with some off breaks, was the most effective English bowler while Pataudi relied on Amarnath and Mankad. It rained again on the Tuesday and the match was abandoned as a draw at lunchtime.

Other matches
In the Indians' match against Surrey beginning on 11 May, in their first innings a last wicket partnership of 249 between Sarwate and Banerjee took the score from 205/9 to 454 all out. This is still the second highest last wicket partnership in all first-class cricket, the highest in England and the highest partnership between numbers 10 and 11. (The only higher last wicket partnership was between numbers 4 and 11.) Sarwate and Banerjee came together with the score at 205/9 and took just over three hours to add 249 before Banerjee was out for 121, leaving Sarwate not out on 124. It was also the only time in first-class cricket that numbers 10 and 11 both scored a century in the same innings. Nayudu took a hat-trick in the Surrey first innings and Surrey were forced to follow-on. They saved the innings defeat but, with Sarwate taking 5–54 in the second innings, the Indians were left with only 20 needed to win.

Statistical summary
The outstanding batsman for the Indians was Vijay Merchant who scored 2,385 runs on the tour with a highest score of 242* among seven centuries at an average of 74.53. Hazare, Modi and Mankad all exceeded 1,000 runs on the tour while Pataudi was just nineteen shy of it. The Indians scored 21 centuries, Merchant accounting for a third of these. Pataudi had four and Mankad three. India's fielding was generally criticised, mostly for dropped catches, but Mankad with 21 catches was the best fielder. Hindlekar kept wicket in 19 games, holding 22 catches and completing 14 stumpings. His deputy Nimbalkar played in eight games with 12 catches and seven stumpings.

Mankad with 129 wickets was easily the best bowler and he achieved a season "double". Next best were Amarnath and Hazare with 56 wickets apiece. Mankad's seven for 37 was the best innings performance by an Indian bowler.

Vinoo Mankad was elected one of the Wisden Cricketers of the Year in the 1947 Wisden along with England players Bedser, Fishlock, Peter Smith and Washbrook. His colleagues Pataudi and Merchant had won the award in 1932 and 1937 respectively.

Aftermath
India was not involved in international cricket in the 1946–47 season, either as hosts or tourists, and so the 1946 Test series in England was the last played by India before Partition was effected on 14 and 15 August 1947, resulting in formation of the Dominion of India and the Dominion of Pakistan as sovereign states. There were no tours to India in the 1947–48 season and the Indian team went to Australia from October to February, playing a series of five Tests in which they were defeated 4–0.

The 1947–48 team in Australia included seven of the 1946 team: Amarnath (now the captain), Gul Mohammad, Hazare, Mankad, Nayudu, Sarwate and Sohoni. Gul Mohammad later played for Pakistan. His 1946 colleague Abdul Hafeez, who changed his name to Abdul Kardar, became Pakistan's first Test captain in October 1952.

Footnotes

References

Bibliography
 
 
 
 
 

1946 in English cricket
1946 in Indian cricket
1946
International cricket competitions from 1945–46 to 1960